Sayed Alireza Aghazada (born 20 January 1991) is the general secretary of the Afghanistan Football Federation, a position he has held since 2012.

Aghazada was elected as Asian Football Confederation Executive Member on 29th AFC Congress. The congress took place on 6 April 2019 in Kuala Lumpur, Malaysia

Aghazada is an Afghan sports expert which served many national and international football positions and he is the youngest Executive Member of AFC since its establishment in 1954.

He has been a member of the Federation since 2007, and as general secretary since 2012.

He was the youngest general secretary of the FIFA member associations in 2012. He was the Deputy General Secretary of the CAFA since 2014 to 2017

During his office term as general secretary, the first Afghan Premier League was established, as well as several training camps for the Afghan national football team in many Asian and European countries and developed the quality of Afghanistan Football into new era and established the first ever Beach Soccer team of Afghanistan and support Futsal and Women's association football in Afghanistan, football federation of Afghanistan contracted with many international companies such Alokozay Group of Companies, Hummel International, Moby Group and many others.

On 8 October 2019, the FIFA Ethics Committee banned him for life from national and international football-related activities for failing to 'report and prevent' sexually abuse of female players. He was also fined 10,000 Swiss francs.

He served the following positions:

Asian Football Confederation Media and Communication Committee Member.

FIFA Organising Committee Member for the FIFA U-20 World Cup.

Central Asian Football Association Head of Marketing and Communication Committee.

References

Football people in Afghanistan
1991 births
Living people